Madinat Jumeirah the Arabian Resort - Dubai is a 5 star resort in Dubai. It is the largest resort in the Emirate, spreading across over 40 hectares of landscapes and gardens. It is designed to resemble a traditional Arabian town. The resort comprises three boutique hotels (Jumeirah Al Qasr, Jumeirah Mina A'Salam, and Jumeirah Al Naseem) and a courtyard of 29 summer houses called Jumeirah Dar Al Masyaf. The resort has over 50 restaurants and bars.

Location 
Madinat Jumeirah is located along two kilometres of private beachfront adjacent to Jumeirah Beach Hotel, Burj Al Arab, and Wild Wadi Water Park. It is one mile away from the Mall of the Emirates station, on the red line metro.

History 
Developer retained Mirage Mille and Mittal Investment Group Ltd. Creative Kingdom Dubai created the master plan and concept for the resort. Leisure Quest International, LLC of the US provided entertainment and attraction planning for the resort.

Design 
Madinat Jumeirah encompasses three boutique hotels and one cluster of summerhouses; Al Qasr, Mina A'Salam, Al Naseem, and Dar Al Masyaf; Arabic summerhouses located around the resort grounds.

Mina A’ Salam or 'The Harbour of Peace' was the first of the boutique hotels to be completed, and features 292 rooms and suites.

Al Qasr, which literally translates to 'The Palace', is made up of 294 rooms and suites, designed to reflect a sheikh’s summer residence.

Dar Al Masyaf consists of 29 stand-alone, two-story residential retreats inspired by traditional Arabian summer houses. Each of the 29 'houses' features 9–11 rooms and suites which are extended across the resort grounds.

Al Naseem, which translates to 'The Breeze', the latest of the boutique hotels to be completed, comprises 430 rooms and suites. It is, however, the only hotel in Madinat Jumeirah without a connection to the other hotels via waterway.

5.4 km of waterways link the different areas of the resort, and water taxis (Abra (boat)) allow guests to travel along them to all parts of the resort.

The Interior Design was led and created by Khuan Chew, Principal of KCA International (www.kca-int.com).

Turtle rehabilitation

The Madinat Jumeirah waterways are home to a turtle sanctuary which aims to house injured turtles prior to release back into the wild.  The turtle pen is located at Mina a'Salam and is directly in between Al Muna and Zheng He's restaurants.

Gallery

See also
 List of buildings in Dubai

References

External links 

 Official web site
 Time Out Dubai - Turtles Saved
 IOSEA Turtles

Resorts in Dubai